Maurice Crum may refer to:

 Maurice Crum Sr. (born 1969), American football player
 Maurice Crum Jr. (born 1986), American football player